Sander Santesson (6 April 1887 – 22 May 1967) was a Swedish athlete. He competed in the men's pole vault at the 1912 Summer Olympics.

References

1887 births
1967 deaths
Athletes (track and field) at the 1912 Summer Olympics
Swedish male pole vaulters
Olympic athletes of Sweden
Place of birth missing